Taranaki is a region in the west of New Zealand's North Island. It is named after its main geographical feature, the stratovolcano of Mount Taranaki, also known as Mount Egmont.

The main centre is the city of New Plymouth. The New Plymouth District is home to more than 65 per cent of the population of Taranaki. New Plymouth is in North Taranaki along with Inglewood and Waitara. South Taranaki towns include Hāwera, Stratford, Eltham, and Ōpunake.

Since 2005, Taranaki has used the promotional brand "Like no other".

Geography

Taranaki is on the west coast of the North Island, surrounding the volcanic peak of Mount Taranaki. The region covers an area of 7258 km2. Its large bays north-west and south-west of Cape Egmont are North Taranaki Bight and South Taranaki Bight.

Mount Taranaki is the second highest mountain in the North Island, and the dominant geographical feature of the region. A Māori legend says that Mount Taranaki previously lived with the Tongariro, Ngāuruhoe and Ruapehu mountains of the central North Island but fled to its current location after a battle with Tongariro. A near-perfect cone, it last erupted in the mid-18th century. The mountain and its immediate surrounds form Egmont National Park. Historically, the area consisted of a narrow coastal plain covered by bracken, tutu, rewarewa and karaka trees, with anywhere not close to the coast covered in dense forest.

Māori had called the mountain Taranaki for many centuries, and Captain James Cook gave it the English name of Egmont after the Earl of Egmont, the recently retired First Lord of the Admiralty who had encouraged his expedition. The mountain has two alternative official names, "Mount Taranaki" and "Mount Egmont".

The region is exceptionally fertile thanks to generous rainfall and rich volcanic soil. Dairy farming predominates, with Fonterra's Whareroa milk factory just outside of Hāwera producing the largest volume of dairy ingredients from a single factory anywhere in the world. There are also oil and gas deposits in the region, both on- and off-shore. The Maui gas field off the south-west coast has provided most of New Zealand's gas supply and once supported two methanol plants, (one formerly a synthetic-petrol plant called the Gas-To-Gasoline plant) at Motunui. Fuel and fertiliser is also produced at a well complex at Kapuni and a number of smaller land-based oilfields. With the Maui field nearing depletion, new offshore resources have been developed: the Kupe field, 30 km south of Hāwera and the Pohokura gas field, 4.5 km north of Waitara.

The way the land mass projects into the Tasman Sea with northerly, westerly and southerly exposures, results in many excellent surfing and windsurfing locations, some of them considered world-class.

Demography
It has a population density of  people per km2. It is the tenth most populous region of New Zealand.

Taranaki Region had a population of 117,561 at the 2018 New Zealand census, an increase of 7,953 people (7.3%) since the 2013 census, and an increase of 13,434 people (12.9%) since the 2006 census. There were 45,249 households. There were 58,251 males and 59,310 females, giving a sex ratio of 0.98 males per female. The median age was 40.0 years (compared with 37.4 years nationally), with 24,666 people (21.0%) aged under 15 years, 19,992 (17.0%) aged 15 to 29, 52,464 (44.6%) aged 30 to 64, and 20,436 (17.4%) aged 65 or older.

Of those at least 15 years old, 13,776 (14.8%) people had a bachelor or higher degree, and 21,690 (23.3%) people had no formal qualifications. The median income was $29,900, compared with $31,800 nationally. 14,271 people (15.4%) earned over $70,000 compared to 17.2% nationally. The employment status of those at least 15 was that 44,673 (48.1%) people were employed full-time, 14,133 (15.2%) were part-time, and 3,681 (4.0%) were unemployed.

Urban areas
Just under half the residents live in New Plymouth, with Hāwera being the next most populous town in the region.

Culture and identity

The region has had a strong Māori presence for centuries. The local iwi (tribes) include Ngāti Mutunga, Ngāti Maru, Ngāti Ruanui, Taranaki, Te Āti Awa, Nga Rauru, Ngāruahinerangi and Ngāti Tama.

Ethnicities were 84.8% European/Pākehā, 19.8% Māori, 2.1% Pacific peoples, 4.5% Asian, and 2.0% other ethnicities (totals add to more than 100% since people could identify with multiple ethnicities).

The percentage of people born overseas was 13.6, compared with 27.1% nationally.

Although some people objected to giving their religion, 51.7% had no religion, 36.0% were Christian, 0.8% were Hindu, 0.5% were Muslim, 0.4% were Buddhist and 2.5% had other religions.

History

The area became home to a number of Māori tribes from the 13th century. From about 1823 the Māori began having contact with European whalers as well as traders who arrived by schooner to buy flax. Around the 1820s and 1830s, whalers targeted Southern right whales in the South Taranaki Bight. In March 1828 Richard "Dicky" Barrett (1807–47) set up a trading post at Ngamotu (present-day New Plymouth). Barrett and his companions, who were armed with muskets and cannon, were welcomed by the Āti Awa tribe for assisting in their continuing wars with Waikato Māori. Following a bloody encounter at Ngamotu in 1832, most of the 2000 Āti Awa living near Ngamotu, as well as Barrett, migrated south to the Kapiti region and Marlborough.

In late 1839 Barrett returned to Taranaki to act as a purchasing agent for the New Zealand Company, which had already begun on-selling the land to prospective settlers in England with the expectation of securing its title. Barrett claimed to have negotiated the purchase of an area extending from Mokau to Cape Egmont, and inland to the upper reaches of the Whanganui River including Mt Taranaki. A later deed of sale included New Plymouth and all the coastal lands of North Taranaki, including Waitara.

European settlement at New Plymouth began with the arrival of the William Bryan in March 1841. European expansion beyond New Plymouth, however, was prevented by Māori opposition to selling their land, a sentiment that deepened as links strengthened with the King Movement. Tension over land ownership continued to mount, leading to the outbreak of war at Waitara in March 1860. Although the pressure for the sale of the Waitara block resulted from the colonists' hunger for land in Taranaki, the greater issue fuelling the conflict was the Government's desire to impose British administration, law and civilisation on the Māori.

The war was fought by more than 3,500 imperial troops brought in from Australia as well as volunteer soldiers and militia against Māori forces that fluctuated from a few hundred and to 1,500. Total losses among the imperial, volunteer, and militia troops are estimated to have been 238, while Māori casualties totalled about 200.

An uneasy truce was negotiated a year later, only to be broken in April 1863 as tensions over land occupation boiled over again.  A total of 5,000 troops fought in the Second Taranaki War against about 1,500 men, women and children. The style of warfare differed markedly from that of the 1860-61 conflict as the army systematically took possession of Māori land by driving off the inhabitants, adopting a "scorched earth" strategy of laying waste to the villages and cultivations of Māori, whether warlike or otherwise. As the troops advanced, the Government built an expanding line of redoubts, behind which settlers built homes and developed farms. The effect was a creeping confiscation of almost a million acres (4,000 km2) of land.

The present main highway on the inland side of Mount Taranaki follows the path taken by the colonial forces under Major General Trevor Chute as they marched, with great difficulty, from Patea to New Plymouth in 1866.

Armed Māori resistance continued in South Taranaki until early 1869, led by the warrior Titokowaru, who reclaimed land almost as far south as Wanganui. A decade later, spiritual leader Te Whiti o Rongomai, based at Parihaka, launched a campaign of passive resistance against government land confiscation, which culminated in a raid by colonial troops on 5 November 1881.

The confiscations, subsequently acknowledged by the New Zealand Government as unjust and illegal, began in 1865 and soon included the entire Taranaki district. Towns including Normanby, Hāwera and Carlyle (Patea) were established on land confiscated as military settlements. The release of a Waitangi Tribunal report on the situation in 1996 led to some debate on the matter. In a speech to a group of psychologists, Associate Minister of Māori Affairs Tariana Turia compared the suppression of Taranaki Māori to the Holocaust, provoking a vigorous reaction around New Zealand, with Prime Minister Helen Clark among those voicing criticism.

Economy
The subnational gross domestic product (GDP) of Taranaki was estimated at NZ$9.51 billion in the year to March 2020, 2.94% of New Zealand's national GDP. The regional GDP per capita was estimated at $76,715 in the same period, the highest in New Zealand.

Taranaki’s economy is centred around dairy farming, hydrocarbon exploration, and manufacturing (including agricultural and energy based manufacturing) with these industries making up approximately 40 percent of the region’s GDP in 2019. Taranaki has had the highest GDP per capita from 2007 onward except in 2017 when Wellington was higher.

In the 2019-20 season, there were 468,000 milking cows in Taranaki, 9.5% of the country's total herd. The cows produced 185,320 tonnes of milk solids, worth $1,334 million at the national average farmgate price ($7.20 per kg). The Dairy Farming industry is the largest employer in Taranaki, comprising 5 per cent of all employees. The region is home to the world’s largest milk production facility by annual volume, Fonterra’s Whareroa Plant near Hawera, which produces milk powder, butter, casein whey and cheese. The region also boasts the largest secondary cheese operation in Asia-Pacific as well as a high-tech lactose plant producing pharmaceutical lactose for the global medical industry and a speciality artisan cheese facility.

Natural gas from Taranaki’s fields accounts for around 20% of New Zealand’s primary energy supply. It provides heat, energy and hot water supply for over 245,000 New Zealand households as well as more than 10,000 commercial users such as restaurants, hotels, greenhouses and hospitals. The single biggest user of natural gas is Methanex, also based in Taranaki, who use it as a feedstock to produce methanol for export. Taranaki's natural gas is also used to make urea for use on farms. The head offices of many energy companies are based in the region along with specialist service and supply companies, including freight, logistics, fabrication, technical, professional services and consultancies as well as environmental and health and safety expertise. The region is renowned for its world class engineering design and project management skills, which tackles on and off shore fabrication and construction.

Governance

Provincial government
From 1853 the Taranaki region was governed as the Taranaki Province (initially known as the New Plymouth Province) until the abolition of New Zealand provinces in 1876. The leading office was that of the superintendent.

The following is a list of superintendents of the Province of Taranaki during this time:

Taranaki Regional Council
The Taranaki Regional Council was formed as part of major nationwide local government reforms in November 1989, for the purpose of integrated catchment management.  The regional council was the successor to the Taranaki Catchment Board, the Taranaki United Council, the Taranaki Harbours Board, and 16 small special-purpose local bodies that were abolished under the Local Government Amendment Act (No 3) 1988.  The council's headquarters were established in the central location of Stratford to "provide a good compromise in respect of overcoming traditional south vs north Taranaki community of interest conflicts" (Taranaki Regional Council, 2001 p. 6).

Chairs
 Ross Allen (1989–2001)
 David Walter (2001–2007)
 David MacLeod (2007–2022)
 Charlotte Littlewood (2022–present)

Motion picture location
Taranaki's landscape and the mountain's supposed resemblance to Mount Fuji led it to be selected as the location for The Last Samurai, a motion picture set in 19th-century Japan.  The movie starred Tom Cruise.

Sports teams 
Notable sports teams from Taranaki include:
 Yarrows Taranaki Bulls - Mitre 10 Cup Rugby Union Team
 Team Taranaki - Central Premier League Football Team
 Taranaki Mountainairs - NBL Basketball Team
 Taranaki Thunder - Women's Basketball Team
 Taranaki Cricket - Men's Cricket Team

Notable people

Harry Atkinson – Premier of New Zealand and Colonial Treasurer
Peter Buck (Te Rangi Hīroa) of Ngāti Mutunga – Māori scholar, politician, military leader, health administrator, anthropologist, museum director, born in Urenui
Richard Faull - New Zealand neuroscientist and academic, born and raised in Tikorangi
Māui Wiremu Pita Naera Pōmare of Ngāti Mutunga - politician, Minister of Health
Frederic Carrington – surveyor and father of New Plymouth
William Douglas Cook – founder of Eastwoodhill Arboretum, Ngatapa, Gisborne and of Pukeiti, world-famous rhododendron garden, New Plymouth.
Hāmi Te Māunu – hereditary Maori leader of Ngāti Mutunga 
Wiremu Kīngi – Māori Chief of Te Āti Awa, leader in the First Taranaki War
William Malone – First World War officer
Len Lye – artist, filmmaker born in Christchurch, collection only housed in New Plymouth
Minarapa Rangihatuake – Methodist missionary, active from about 1839 in Taranaki
Michael Smither – artist
Ronald Syme – scholar of ancient history
Te Whiti o Rongomai – spiritual leader of Parihaka and pioneer of peaceful protest strategies

Sports people
All Blacks: Beauden Barrett, Scott Barrett, Jordie Barrett, Grant Fox, Luke McAlister, Kayla McAlister, Graham Mourie, Conrad Smith, Carl Hayman
Rugby League: , Issac Luke, Curtis Rona, Howie Tamati Graham West
Michael Campbell – golfer
Paige Hareb – professional surfer
Peter Snell – Gold medal-winning athlete, born in Ōpunake
Commonwealth gold Bowls, Brian Symes.
7s,World, Commonwealth,Olympic gold medalists..Gayle Broughton & Mikalya Blyde. Silver Ferns, Ardean Harper,

See also
First Taranaki War
Second Taranaki War
Titokowaru's War
New Zealand land confiscations
Taranaki Rugby Football Union
TSB Bank (New Zealand) – formerly Taranaki Savings Bank
Water quality in Taranaki

References

Further reading

External links

 Taranaki – Like No Other: The Official Tourism website
 Puke Ariki: Taranaki's combined museum, library and visitor information centre
 Taranaki Tourism website with in-depth information about the region and an image library 
 Taranaki Regional Council website